Jacob Peter Clear  (born 18 January 1985) is an Australian sprint canoeist who competed in the late 2000s. At the 2008 Summer Olympics in Beijing, he was eliminated in the semifinals of the K-2 500 m event. He was a member of the gold medal-winning Australian Kayak Four (K4) 1000m team in the London Olympics 2012.

Clear was a life-saving nipper from the age of 5 and began kayaking at the age of 21. His early achievements are documented on the Olympics website.

References

External links
 
 
 

1985 births
Australian male canoeists
Canoeists at the 2008 Summer Olympics
Canoeists at the 2012 Summer Olympics
Living people
Olympic canoeists of Australia
Australian Institute of Sport canoeists
Olympic gold medalists for Australia
Olympic medalists in canoeing
ICF Canoe Sprint World Championships medalists in kayak
Medalists at the 2012 Summer Olympics
Canoeists at the 2016 Summer Olympics
Recipients of the Medal of the Order of Australia
21st-century Australian people